Erny Brenner (13 September 1931 – 9 July 2016) was a Luxembourgish association football player.

International career
He was a member of the Luxembourg national football team from 1955 to 1965.

References

External links

1931 births
2016 deaths
People from Dudelange
Association football defenders
Luxembourgian footballers
Luxembourg international footballers
FC Aris Bonnevoie players
Stade Dudelange players
Luxembourg National Division players